Senator Upson may refer to:

Charles Upson (1821–1885), Michigan State Senate
William H. Upson (1823–1910), Ohio State Senate